The Alex William House, also known as the Greystone Hotel, is a historic house in Jackson, Mississippi. It was built in 1912 by George Thomas, an African-American building contractor, for Alex Williams, an African-American grocer. From 1922 to 1945, it belonged to the Marino family, and it became a hotel in 1950.

The house was designed in the Colonial Revival architectural style. It has been listed on the National Register of Historic Places since July 3, 1979.

References

Houses on the National Register of Historic Places in Mississippi
National Register of Historic Places in Hinds County, Mississippi
Colonial Revival architecture in Mississippi
Houses completed in 1912